Ottawa National Wildlife Refuge Complex is a National Wildlife Refuge complex in the state of Ohio.

Refuges within the complex
 Cedar Point National Wildlife Refuge
 Ottawa National Wildlife Refuge  
 West Sister Island National Wildlife Refuge

References
Complex website

National Wildlife Refuges in Ohio